Marcelo Tubert (born February 11, 1952) is an Argentine-born American actor.

Biography

Early life and career
Born in Córdoba, Argentina, Tubert's mother, Miriam Tubert, is an actress who did a great deal of stage work and had her own children's radio show. Tubert's introduction to theatre came at the age of three, in Garcia Lorca's Yerma, when a child actor in a visiting troupe became ill. When he was seven, Marcelo and his family moved to Los Angeles where he later took up acting seriously in high school then studied at Los Angeles City College's Theatre Arts Department.

Among his many early influences, he cites actor Alejandro Rey. Tubert began with small television and film roles. As those roles grew larger, he was also proving his versatility, establishing himself in theatre and with commercial and voiceover work.

Television
Tubert's recurring and guest-starring appearances include such shows as Prison Break, NCIS, Jane the Virgin, New Girl CSI:Miami, Supah Ninjas, Without a Trace, ER, The War At Home, Monk, George Lopez, JAG, Frasier, Seinfeld, Star Trek: The Next Generation, The Golden Girls and Star Trek: Picard.

Film and voice roles
Tubert's numerous film roles include parts in the films Miss Congeniality 2: Armed and Fabulous, Tremors 2: Aftershocks, Postcards from the Edge, and the Roger Corman directed remake of The Masque of the Red Death.

Among his most notable voice roles, was as Laurent in the English version of Toys in the Attic. Other roles include in the animated series Pinky and the Brain, Batman: The Animated Series, The Real Adventures of Jonny Quest and King of the Hill. He has also contributed additional voices to, Kung Fu Panda 2 Madagascar 2, Over The Hedge, Shrek II, Shark Tale, Apocalypto, and Passion of the Christ.

Selected filmography

Animation
 Hellsing Ultimate - Doctor
 Handy Manny - Mr. Alverez

Live action
 Cane - Marcos Greenberg
 Cory in the House - Ambassador Raum Paroom
 The Golden Girls - Raoul (S1E21, "Flu Attack") 
 The West Wing - Palestinian Prime Minister Saeb Mukarat
 Jane the Virgin - Pablo
 Simon & Simon - Dr Suvi Raj (Heels and Toes)
 Star Trek: Picard - Mr. Alvarez (S2E03, "Assimilation")

Films
 Leprechaun 3 - Gupta
 Justice League: Gods and Monsters - Tough Guy
 Tremors II: Aftershocks - Señor Carlos Ortega

Video games
 Age of Empires III - Suleiman the Magnificent
 BioShock - Toasty, Waders
 BioShock 2 - Toasty, Ducky
 Kill Switch - Soldier
 Lands of Lore: Guardians of Destiny - Ja Kel, Guard #7, Shaman, Goofball A, Friend
 Lands of Lore III - David LeGre, Dimple the Guard, Jakel
 Pirates of the Caribbean: At World's End - Town Musician
 Spyro 2: Ripto's Rage - Basil the Explorer, Colossus Monks
 Spyro: Year of the Dragon - Gus, Marco, Tomb Pharaohs

References

External links

1952 births
Living people
American male film actors
American male television actors
American male video game actors
American male voice actors
Argentine emigrants to the United States
Los Angeles City College alumni
Male actors from Los Angeles